Harry Everington (21 February 1929 – 2000) was a British sculptor, the co-founder of the former Frink School of Figurative Sculpture based in the towns of Stoke-on-Trent (latterly Tunstall), Staffordshire.

Life
Everington was born on 21 February 1929 near Keighley in  Yorkshire. He attended Roundhay School and then studied at  Leeds College of Art and  the Slade in London. Following  National Service in the Royal Air Force he became  a lecturer at Shrewsbury College of Art. In the mid-1960s he moved to Swansea College of Art, where he became head of the fine art and architecture departure.  In the early 1970s he became Principal of Dyfed College of Art.

Following his  resigning from Dyfed College he moved to the Stoke-on-Trent, where  he concentrated on his own sculptures, working in limestone, wood, clay and steel. At the age of 60 he enrolled as a student at the Sir Henry Doulton School of Art. In the late 1980s Harry established the sculpture studio "Woodstringthistlefoss" at Longnor in the Staffordshire Moorlands.  Following the closure of the Sir Henry Doulton School of Art in 1993, Everington, and Rosemary Barnett, the former head of the Doulton School, set up the Frink School (named after Dame Elisabeth Frink). It opened in 1996.

Simon Everington, a  British sculptor living in Japan, is his youngest son.

Public works
A sculpture of Saint Bertram in the church in Longnor, Staffordshire Moorlands.
The Jerwood Foundation purchased Everington's bronze The Crusader for the Jerwood Sculpture Park, Ragley Hall in 2000, where it was installed a few days before his death. Everington described the work, conceived in 1992, as representing "the ancient idealist charging his winded horse into the brick wall of contemporary life". It remained at Ragley until 2012, when the foundation sold it at auction  through Sotheby's.

References

External links

 Jerwood Foundation biography of Everington, who has work in their permanent collection at Ragley Hall 
 The Crusader, in public collection, Jerwood Sculpture
 The writings of Harry Everington on sculpture
 Sculpture and Paintings of Simon Everington

1929 births
2000 deaths
Alumni of Leeds Arts University
Alumni of the Slade School of Fine Art
English sculptors
English male sculptors
Modern sculptors
People educated at Roundhay School
People from Keighley